The 1996 New York Giants season was the franchise's 72nd season in the National Football League (NFL) and their fourth and final under head coach Dan Reeves. The team was looking to improve on its 5-11 finish from the year before. 

In the 1996 NFL Draft, the Giants selected defensive end Cedric Jones with the fifth overall pick. The Giants' first game of the season was at home against the Buffalo Bills, and resulted in a 23–20 loss in overtime. After being shut out by the Dallas Cowboys, New York fell to 0–3 with a 31–10 defeat to the Washington Redskins. Against the New York Jets, the Giants earned their first victory of the season; a 15–10 win over the Minnesota Vikings left them with a 2–3 record heading into their bye week. The team then lost four of its next six games. After defeating the Cowboys, the Giants' record entering December stood at 5–7. They ended the season by losing three of their last four games. With a 6–10 record, the Giants finished in last place in the National Football Conference East Division. After the season, the Giants fired Reeves and hired Jim Fassel as his replacement.

Quarterback Dave Brown started all 16 games for the Giants in 1996, throwing for 12 touchdowns and 20 interceptions. New York's leading running back was Rodney Hampton, who had 254 carries for 827 yards. Wide receivers Chris Calloway and Thomas Lewis led the Giants with four touchdowns and 53 receptions each; Calloway had a team-high 739 receiving yards. Defensively, Chad Bratzke and Michael Strahan had the most sacks among Giants players with five apiece, while Jason Sehorn had five interceptions to lead the team.

Offseason

NFL Draft

Personnel

Staff

Roster

Regular season

Schedule

Standings

Game summaries

Week 4: at New York Jets

Both New York teams were winless as they entered the game at Giants Stadium. The Jets got on the board first with Nick Lowery kicking a 46-yard field goal. In the second quarter, the Giants responded with Chris Calloway catching a touchdown pass from Dave Brown. In the third quarter, the Jets cut the Giants' lead to one point thanks to a 39-yard field goal, once again coming from Lowery. The Giants increased the lead in the fourth quarter thanks to two 20-yard field goals from Brad Daluiso, helping the Giants secure their first win of the season.

See also 
 List of New York Giants seasons

References 

New York Giants seasons
New York Giants
New York Giants season
20th century in East Rutherford, New Jersey
Meadowlands Sports Complex